Lila Greengrass Blackdeer (February 14, 1932 – October 30, 2021), also known as Masuhijajawiga, was an American maker of black ash baskets, in the Ho-Chunk tradition. She was awarded a National Heritage Fellowship in 1999.

Early life 
Lila Greengrass was born in Black River Falls, Wisconsin, the daughter of Edwin Greengrass and Bessie Youngbear. Her father attended Carlisle Indian Industrial School from 1913 to 1917. She began making baskets as a child, instructed by her mother in the techniques of their Ho-Chunk (or Winnebago) tradition.

Career 
Blackdeer taught basketmaking and other crafts for much of her life, including 24 years at Western Wisconsin Technical College. She was also manager of Winnebago Indian Mission Industries, a garment factory run by women in her community, on the site of an old mission school. In addition to basketry, Blackdeer was skilled in sewing, dyeing, needlework, and beadwork. She was awarded a National Heritage Fellowship by the National Endowment for the Arts in 1999. She was one of the elder-artists included in an exhibition and documentation project by the Hocak Wazijaci Language and Culture Preservation Committee in 1994. Works by Blackdeer are in the collections of the Milwaukee Public Museum, Marquette University, and the University of Wisconsin, and many private collections. Her baskets were part of an exhibit at Edgewood College in 2017.

Personal life 
Lila Greengrass married William P. Blackdeer in 1954. They had four children. Her husband died in 2001. She died in 2021, aged 89 years.

References 

1932 births
2021 deaths
People from Black River Falls, Wisconsin
Native American women artists
Ho-Chunk Nation of Wisconsin people
Native American basket weavers
20th-century American women artists
21st-century American women artists
20th-century Native American women
20th-century Native Americans
21st-century Native American women
21st-century Native Americans
Artists from Wisconsin
Native American people from Wisconsin